The 1975–76 Phoenix Suns season was the eighth season for the Phoenix Suns of the National Basketball Association. The season included an improbable run to the NBA Finals by a team that had never won a playoff series and made the playoffs only one other season in the franchise's existence. With a regular season record of 42–40, the Suns had finished third in the Pacific division standings and improved upon last season's win total by 10 games. The ensuing playoff run took plenty by surprise, including a seven-game series win against the Western Conference's top seed and defending NBA champion Golden State Warriors, a team that had finished 17 games ahead of the Suns in the divisional standings. The franchise's first Finals appearance pitted them against a 12-time champion in the Boston Celtics, whose roster featured three players from that season's All-Star Game. The 1976 NBA Finals would feature a memorable Game 5 triple-overtime thriller filled with controversies in which the Suns narrowly lost. Returning home for Game 6, the demoralized Suns would lose Game 6 and the series but not before endearing a generation of fans to the Suns franchise and showcasing basketball from the desert southwest. The team's "Cinderella" season earned them the nickname Sunderella Suns. John MacLeod was head coach and the Suns played their home games at Arizona Veterans Memorial Coliseum.

Offseason

NBA Draft

Finishing the previous season with a 32–50 record, the Suns earned the fourth pick in the draft, which they used to select center Alvan Adams from Oklahoma. Adams averaged 23.4 points and 12.8 rebounds per game in three seasons with the Sooners. With averages of 19 points, 9.1 rebounds, 5.6 assists, 1.5 steals, and 1.5 blocks a game, Adams would become an All-Star in his first NBA season, and go on to be named Rookie of the Year. Adams would spend his entire 13-year career with the Suns, and would have his #33 jersey retired by the franchise in 1988.

On draft day, the Suns traded one of their 1976 first-round picks (acquired from a trade with the New Orleans Jazz in 1974) to the Buffalo Braves for the 16th pick in the 1975 draft. The Suns used their additional pick to select guard Ricky Sobers from UNLV. In 1976, the Braves would use the sixth pick to select future Hall of Famer Adrian Dantley. Sobers would play two seasons for the Suns, contributing significantly to their Finals run, before being traded to the Indiana Pacers for Don Buse.

In the third round, the Suns selected center Bayard Forrest from Grand Canyon University. Forrest would play another season with the Antelopes, and be drafted again by the Seattle SuperSonics in 1976. The Sonics would trade the rights to Forrest back to the Suns in 1977 for a 1979 second-round pick. Forrest played two seasons for the Suns as a backup center, before being sidelined by thyroid cancer, forcing him to retire in 1980.

Free agency
On June 10, the Suns signed free agent point guard Dennis "Mo" Layton. Layton began his career with the Suns in 1971, playing two seasons before being waived. He would then play for the Portland Trail Blazers and the Memphis Tams of the ABA in 1973–74, and sit for the 1974–75 season as a free agent. Layton was waived by the Suns during the preseason and would again sit through 1975–76 season as a free agent.

On October 24, the Suns claimed veteran swingman John Wetzel off of waivers from the Atlanta Hawks. Wetzel would play sparingly throughout the season, averaging 6.7 minutes in 37 regular season games, and 2.5 minutes in two playoff games. Wetzel had played for the Suns from 1970 to 1972, and would spend his final season with the Suns before retiring in August 1976. Wetzel would later become an assistant coach with the Suns from 1979 to 1987, before becoming the team's head coach for the 1987–88 season.

Trades
On May 23, the Suns traded three-time All-Star guard Charlie Scott to the Boston Celtics for guard Paul Westphal, a 1975 second-round draft pick, and a 1976 second-round draft pick. Suns general manager Jerry Colangelo released this statement after the trade:

Westphal had spent his first three years playing a limited role for Boston, but would blossom as a starter for the Suns. From 1976–77 to 1979–80, Westphal would make four consecutive All-Star appearances, voted as a starter three times, and be named to four All-NBA Teams, including three First Team selections. Scott's minutes and points would decrease with the Celtics, and he would not again be selected as an All-Star. Later, Westphal would join the Suns for a second stint during the 1983-84 NBA season, his last in the NBA as a player.  Westphal would then pursue a coaching career eventually joining the Suns as an assistant coach in 1988 under Cotton Fitzsimmons and would succeed him as head coach in 1992 and coach the Suns to their second Finals appearance.

On May 28, the Suns traded center Earl Williams to the Detroit Pistons for forward Willie Norwood. Unable to play in training camp due to knee injuries, the Suns exercised a contract clause that allowed them to send Norwood back to the Pistons. On September 30, the Pistons would send the Suns a 1976 second-round draft pick as compensation for Williams.

On June 9, the Suns traded a 1976 second-round draft pick to the Portland Trail Blazers for guard Phil Lumpkin. Playing the 1975–76 season as a backup point guard, Lumpkin would average 2.1 points and 1.4 assists in 34 regular season games, and 1.8 points and 1.2 assists in 17 playoff games. Lumpkin was waived prior to the 1976–77 season and would not play in the NBA again.

On September 17, the Suns traded guard Greg Jackson to the Washington Bullets for future draft considerations. Jackson was waived by the Bullets a month later and did not play in the NBA again.

Roster

Preseason
The Suns held their training camp from September 25 to October 5 at the Yavapai College Gymnasium in Prescott, Arizona. The initial training camp roster consisted of returning Suns Dennis Awtrey, Mike Bantom, Keith Erickson, Nate Hawthorne, Gary Melchionni, Curtis Perry, Fred Saunders and Dick Van Arsdale, as well as newly acquired players Mo Layton, Phil Lumpkin, Willie Norwood and Paul Westphal, rookies Alvan Adams, John Shumate and Ricky Sobers, and training camp invitee Duane Read. Norwood, acquired in an earlier trade with the Detroit Pistons, was unable to play due to knee problems and sent back to the Pistons on October 30. Layton was waived on October 2 after appearing in one exhibition game. Read, a free agent guard from Portland State, had impressed the Suns staff during Los Angeles summer league play and was invited to training camp. Read started in the Suns first preseason game but was cut from the roster before the season. Melchionni was waived on October 24, one day prior to the start of the regular season. Melchionni had played with the Suns for the last two years as a backup point guard, averaging 7.8 points, 2.4 rebounds and 2.2 assists in 137 games.

The loss of Norwood and injuries to Awtrey, Lumpkin, Melchionni and Saunders cut the team's initial preseason roster down to 11. Even with an abbreviated roster, the Suns finished the preseason with a 5–1 record, including three wins over the rival Los Angeles Lakers, a win over the Seattle SuperSonics, and a win over the Kansas City Kings. Their one loss came at the hands of the Kings, who beat the Suns 105–109 in overtime to close the preseason. Westphal led the Suns with 21.2 points a game in exhibition play, while Adams averaged 15.3 points and a team high 6.2 assists a game. Not included in the Suns preseason record was an exhibition game against the United States Pan American team on October 6 at Arizona Veterans Memorial Coliseum. The collegiate squad, who would go on to win the gold medal at the 1975 Pan American Games, narrowly defeated the Suns 72–70 off a last second layup from future NBA champion Johnny Davis.

Game log

!!Streak
|-
|- align="center" bgcolor="#ccffcc"
| 1
| October 1
| Los Angeles
| W 114–112
| Alvan Adams (24)
| Robertson Gymnasium
| 1–0
| W 1
|- align="center" bgcolor="#ccffcc"
| 2
| October 8
| Los Angeles
| W 111–106
| Alvan Adams (17)
| Bakersfield, CA
| 2–0
| W 2
|- align="center" bgcolor="#ccffcc"
| 3
| October 11
| Los Angeles
| W 104–94
| Paul Westphal (26)
| Arizona Veterans Memorial Coliseum
| 3–0
| W 3
|- align="center" bgcolor="#ccffcc"
| 4
| October 12
| Seattle
| W 104–92
| Paul Westphal (32)
| Ellensburg, WA
| 4–0
| W 4
|- align="center" bgcolor="#ccffcc"
| 5
| October 18
| Kansas City
| W 101–90
| 
| 
| 5–0
| W 5
|- align="center" bgcolor="#ffcccc"
| 6
| November 8
| Kansas City
| L 105–109 (OT)
| Paul Westphal (17)
| Las Vegas, NV
| 5–1
| L 1
|-

Regular season

Standings

Record vs. opponents

Game log

!!Streak
|-
|- align="center" bgcolor="#ccffcc"
| 1
| October 25
| @ Portland
| W 89–88
| Paul Westphal (17)
| Memorial Coliseum11,274
| 1–0
| W 1
|- align="center" bgcolor="#ffcccc"
| 2
| October 26
| @ Seattle
| L 99–113
| Alvan Adams (29)
| Seattle Center Coliseum13,288
| 1–1
| L 1
|-
!!Streak
|-
|- align="center" bgcolor="#ffcccc"
| 3
| November 1
| @ Kansas City
| L 100–106
| Paul Westphal (22)
| Kemper Arena6,632
| 1–2
| L 2
|- align="center" bgcolor="#ccffcc"
| 4
| November 4
| @ Chicago
| W 96–80
| Alvan Adams (18)
| Chicago Stadium5,216
| 2–2
| W 1
|- align="center" bgcolor="#ffcccc"
| 5
| November 7
| @ Philadelphia
| L 99–103
| Curtis Perry (21)
| The Spectrum9,549
| 2–3
| L 1
|- align="center" bgcolor="#ffcccc"
| 6
| November 8
| @ Buffalo
| L 105–110
| Paul Westphal (29)
| Buffalo Memorial Auditorium10,253
| 2–4
| L 2
|- align="center" bgcolor="#ccffcc"
| 7
| November 11
| New York
| W 112–81
| Paul Westphal (21)
| Arizona Veterans Memorial Coliseum8,576
| 3–4
| W 1
|- align="center" bgcolor="#ccffcc"
| 8
| November 13
| Seattle
| W 106–103
| Dick Van Arsdale (20)
| Arizona Veterans Memorial Coliseum5,016
| 4–4
| W 2
|- align="center" bgcolor="#ffcccc"
| 9
| November 14
| @ Los Angeles
| L 107–114
| Alvan Adams (35)
| The Forum11,450
| 4–5
| L 1
|- align="center" bgcolor="#ffcccc"
| 10
| November 19
| Milwaukee
| L 94–96
| Dick Van Arsdale (18)
| Arizona Veterans Memorial Coliseum5,582
| 4–6
| L 2
|- align="center" bgcolor="#ccffcc"
| 11
| November 21
| Houston
| W 107–92
| Paul Westphal (22)
| Arizona Veterans Memorial Coliseum6,230
| 5–6
| W 1
|- align="center" bgcolor="#ccffcc"
| 12
| November 26
| Buffalo
| W 107–106
| John Shumate (25)
| Arizona Veterans Memorial Coliseum8,157
| 6–6
| W 2
|- align="center" bgcolor="#ccffcc"
| 13
| November 28
| Portland
| W 110–101
| Paul Westphal (21)
| Arizona Veterans Memorial Coliseum7,769
| 7–6
| W 3
|- align="center" bgcolor="#ffcccc"
| 14
| November 29
| @ Golden State
| L 100–112
| Paul Westphal (27)
| Oakland–Alameda County Coliseum Arena12,787
| 7–7
| L 1
|-
!!Streak
|-
|- align="center" bgcolor="#ccffcc"
| 15
| December 2
| Golden State
| W 115–98
| Alvan Adams (23)
| Arizona Veterans Memorial Coliseum5,179
| 8–7
| W 1
|- align="center" bgcolor="#ffcccc"
| 16
| December 5
| Washington
| L 87–92
| Alvan Adams (17)
| Arizona Veterans Memorial Coliseum8,065
| 8–8
| L 1
|- align="center" bgcolor="#ccffcc"
| 17
| December 7
| Chicago
| W 114–97
| Dick Van Arsdale (23)
| Arizona Veterans Memorial Coliseum4,383
| 9–8
| W 1
|- align="center" bgcolor="#ccffcc"
| 18
| December 9
| @ New Orleans
| W 104–89
| Dick Van Arsdale (25)
| Louisiana Superdome7,619
| 10–8
| W 2
|- align="center" bgcolor="#ccffcc"
| 19
| December 10
| @ Houston
| W 105–91
| Paul Westphal (32)
| The Summit5,358
| 11–8
| W 3
|- align="center" bgcolor="#ffcccc"
| 20
| December 11
| Philadelphia
| L 106–110
| Alvan Adams (21)
| Arizona Veterans Memorial Coliseum6,310
| 11–9
| L 1
|- align="center" bgcolor="#ccffcc"
| 21
| December 13
| Los Angeles
| W 116–108
| Paul Westphal (26)
| Arizona Veterans Memorial Coliseum7,842
| 12–9
| W 1
|- align="center" bgcolor="#ccffcc"
| 22
| December 14
| @ Portland
| W 105–96
| Alvan Adams (20)
| Memorial Coliseum10,544
| 13–9
| W 2
|- align="center" bgcolor="#ccffcc"
| 23
| December 17
| Milwaukee
| W 116–111
| Alvan Adams,Keith Erickson (25)
| Arizona Veterans Memorial Coliseum5,689
| 14–9
| W 3
|- align="center" bgcolor="#ffcccc"
| 24
| December 19
| Cleveland
| L 124–128 (2OT)
| Keith Erickson,Dick Van Arsdale (26)
| Arizona Veterans Memorial Coliseum6,809
| 14–10
| L 1
|- align="center" bgcolor="#ffcccc"
| 25
| December 21
| New Orleans
| L 107–120
| John Shumate (18)
| Arizona Veterans Memorial Coliseum6,853
| 14–11
| L 2
|- align="center" bgcolor="#ccffcc"
| 26
| December 25
| Kansas City
| W 122–111
| Curtis Perry (27)
| Arizona Veterans Memorial Coliseum11,114
| 15–11
| W 1
|- align="center" bgcolor="#ffcccc"
| 27
| December 26
| Boston
| L 106–112
| Paul Westphal (22)
| Arizona Veterans Memorial Coliseum11,842
| 15–12
| L 1
|- align="center" bgcolor="#ffcccc"
| 28
| December 28
| @ Milwaukee
| L 85–88
| Keith Erickson (22)
| MECCA Arena10,938
| 15–13
| L 2
|- align="center" bgcolor="#ffcccc"
| 29
| December 30
| @ New York
| L 88–114
| John Shumate (21)
| Madison Square Garden16,064
| 15–14
| L 3
|-
!!Streak
|-
|- align="center" bgcolor="#ffcccc"
| 30
| January 1
| @ Washington
| L 103–114
| Paul Westphal (25)
| Capital Centre4,919
| 15–15
| L 4
|- align="center" bgcolor="#ccffcc"
| 31
| January 3
| @ Atlanta
| W 100–89
| Dick Van Arsdale (18)
| Omni Coliseum5,803
| 16–15
| W 1
|- align="center" bgcolor="#ffcccc"
| 32
| January 4
| @ Kansas City
| L 86–98
| Keith Erickson (17)
| Kemper Arena5,040
| 16–16
| L 1
|- align="center" bgcolor="#ffcccc"
| 33
| January 7
| Golden State
| L 110–114
| Paul Westphal (23)
| Arizona Veterans Memorial Coliseum6,696
| 16–17
| L 2
|- align="center" bgcolor="#ffcccc"
| 34
| January 8
| @ Golden State
| L 113–129
| Keith Erickson (25)
| Oakland–Alameda County Coliseum Arena9,807
| 16–18
| L 3
|- align="center" bgcolor="#ffcccc"
| 35
| January 9
| Seattle
| L 110–112 (OT)
| Alvan Adams (29)
| Arizona Veterans Memorial Coliseum5,774
| 16–19
| L 4
|- align="center" bgcolor="#ffcccc"
| 36
| January 11
| New York
| L 98–99
| Keith Erickson (21)
| Arizona Veterans Memorial Coliseum6,429
| 16–20
| L 5
|- align="center" bgcolor="#ffcccc"
| 37
| January 15
| Buffalo
| L 119–126
| John Shumate (25)
| Arizona Veterans Memorial Coliseum6,138
| 16–21
| L 6
|- align="center" bgcolor="#ffcccc"
| 38
| January 17
| @ Cleveland
| L 85–105
| Alvan Adams (18)
| Coliseum at Richfield8,082
| 16–22
| L 7
|- align="center" bgcolor="#ccffcc"
| 39
| January 18
| @ Detroit
| W 122–118
| John Shumate (28)
| Cobo Arena3,054
| 17–22
| W 1
|- align="center" bgcolor="#ffcccc"
| 40
| January 20
| @ Buffalo
| L 103–112
| Paul Westphal (27)
| Buffalo Memorial Auditorium8,478
| 17–23
| L 1
|- align="center" bgcolor="#ffcccc"
| 41
| January 21
| @ Boston
| L 100–114
| Alvan Adams (23)
| Boston Garden11,562
| 17–24
| L 2
|- align="center" bgcolor="#ccffcc"
| 42
| January 23
| Houston
| W 124–115
| Paul Westphal (28)
| Arizona Veterans Memorial Coliseum6,341
| 18–24
| W 1
|- align="center" bgcolor="#ffcccc"
| 43
| January 24
| Washington
| L 84–100
| Alvan Adams,Paul Westphal (16)
| Arizona Veterans Memorial Coliseum7,263
| 18–25
| L 1
|- align="center" bgcolor="#ffcccc"
| 44
| January 28
| @ Los Angeles
| L 118–121
| Paul Westphal (30)
| The Forum11,735
| 18–26
| L 2
|- align="center" bgcolor="#ffcccc"
| 45
| January 29
| Milwaukee
| L 96–105
| Paul Westphal (29)
| Arizona Veterans Memorial Coliseum7,125
| 18–27
| L 3
|- align="center" bgcolor="#ccffcc"
| 46
| January 31
| Philadelphia
| W 119–105
| Alvan Adams (30)
| Arizona Veterans Memorial Coliseum8,134
| 19–27
| W 1
|-
!!Streak
|-
|- align="center"
|colspan="9" bgcolor="#bbcaff"|All-Star Break
|- align="center" bgcolor="#ccffcc"
| 47
| February 6
| Golden State
| W 118–111
| Alvan Adams (33)
| Arizona Veterans Memorial Coliseum7,187
| 20–27
| W 1
|- align="center" bgcolor="#ccffcc"
| 48
| February 8
| @ Seattle
| W 107–101 (OT)
| Nate Hawthorne (25)
| Seattle Center Coliseum13,039
| 21–27
| W 2
|- align="center" bgcolor="#ccffcc"
| 49
| February 11
| Detroit
| W 123–94
| Alvan Adams (22)
| Arizona Veterans Memorial Coliseum5,718
| 22–27
| W 3
|- align="center" bgcolor="#ffcccc"
| 50
| February 13
| Boston
| L 108–109
| Paul Westphal (31)
| Arizona Veterans Memorial Coliseum8,130
| 22–28
| L 1
|- align="center" bgcolor="#ccffcc"
| 51
| February 14
| New Orleans
| W 112–93
| Alvan Adams (25)
| Arizona Veterans Memorial Coliseum6,539
| 23–28
| W 1
|- align="center" bgcolor="#ffcccc"
| 52
| February 17
| @ Chicago
| L 111–114 (OT)
| Alvan Adams (32)
| Chicago Stadium4,313
| 23–29
| L 1
|- align="center" bgcolor="#ffcccc"
| 53
| February 18
| @ Detroit
| L 94–105
| Paul Westphal (22)
| Cobo Arena3,045
| 23–30
| L 2
|- align="center" bgcolor="#ccffcc"
| 54
| February 20
| @ New Orleans
| W 103–102
| Alvan Adams (28)
| Louisiana Superdome10,519
| 24–30
| W 1
|- align="center" bgcolor="#ccffcc"
| 55
| February 21
| @ Houston
| W 110–108 (OT)
| Alvan Adams,Paul Westphal (24)
| The Summit6,043
| 25–30
| W 2
|- align="center" bgcolor="#ffcccc"
| 56
| February 24
| Kansas City
| L 117–120 (OT)
| Alvan Adams (30)
| Arizona Veterans Memorial Coliseum6,416
| 25–31
| L 1
|- align="center" bgcolor="#ccffcc"
| 57
| February 26
| Atlanta
| W 115–97
| Ricky Sobers,Paul Westphal (27)
| Arizona Veterans Memorial Coliseum5,820
| 26–31
| W 1
|- align="center" bgcolor="#ffcccc"
| 58
| February 28
| @ Washington
| L 89–92
| Paul Westphal (23)
| Capital Centre9,245
| 26–32
| L 1
|- align="center" bgcolor="#ccffcc"
| 59
| February 29
| @ Detroit
| W 109–98
| Paul Westphal (32)
| Cobo Arena6,143
| 27–32
| W 1
|-
!!Streak
|-
|- align="center" bgcolor="#ccffcc"
| 60
| March 3
| Cleveland
| W 108–92
| Paul Westphal (31)
| Arizona Veterans Memorial Coliseum4,523
| 28–32
| W 2
|- align="center" bgcolor="#ccffcc"
| 61
| March 5
| Chicago
| W 99–97
| Alvan Adams,Paul Westphal (22)
| Arizona Veterans Memorial Coliseum5,346
| 29–32
| W 3
|- align="center" bgcolor="#ffcccc"
| 62
| March 6
| @ Portland
| L 99–118
| Nate Hawthorne (19)
| Memorial Coliseum9,142
| 29–33
| L 1
|- align="center" bgcolor="#ccffcc"
| 63
| March 7
| Portland
| W 106–84
| Paul Westphal (30)
| Arizona Veterans Memorial Coliseum5,039
| 30–33
| W 1
|- align="center" bgcolor="#ffcccc"
| 64
| March 10
| @ Philadelphia
| L 108–125
| Alvan Adams (24)
| The Spectrum10,061
| 30–34
| L 1
|- align="center" bgcolor="#ccffcc"
| 65
| March 11
| @ Atlanta
| W 104–99
| Paul Westphal (32)
| Omni Coliseum4,137
| 31–34
| W 1
|- align="center" bgcolor="#ffcccc"
| 66
| March 13
| @ Cleveland
| L 77–99
| Curtis Perry (14)
| Coliseum at Richfield17,592
| 31–35
| L 1
|- align="center" bgcolor="#ccffcc"
| 67
| March 14
| @ Milwaukee
| W 108–106
| Alvan Adams (25)
| MECCA Arena10,938
| 32–35
| W 1
|- align="center" bgcolor="#ffcccc"
| 68
| March 16
| @ Chicago
| L 87–120
| Alvan Adams (15)
| Chicago Stadium3,392
| 32–36
| L 1
|- align="center" bgcolor="#ccffcc"
| 69
| March 18
| Detroit
| W 106–100
| Gar Heard (27)
| Arizona Veterans Memorial Coliseum5,687
| 33–36
| W 1
|- align="center" bgcolor="#ccffcc"
| 70
| March 20
| Los Angeles
| W 106–93
| Alvan Adams (29)
| Arizona Veterans Memorial Coliseum9,123
| 34–36
| W 2
|- align="center" bgcolor="#ccffcc"
| 71
| March 23
| Seattle
| W 104–97
| Paul Westphal (39)
| Arizona Veterans Memorial Coliseum7,589
| 35–36
| W 3
|- align="center" bgcolor="#ccffcc"
| 72
| March 25
| Atlanta
| W 107–98
| Paul Westphal (27)
| Arizona Veterans Memorial Coliseum6,257
| 36–36
| W 4
|- align="center" bgcolor="#ccffcc"
| 73
| March 27
| Kansas City
| W 117–110
| Paul Westphal (27)
| Arizona Veterans Memorial Coliseum9,386
| 37–36
| W 5
|- align="center" bgcolor="#ccffcc"
| 74
| March 28
| @ Los Angeles
| W 100–97
| Paul Westphal (27)
| The Forum11,732
| 38–36
| W 6
|- align="center" bgcolor="#ccffcc"
| 75
| March 30
| @ New York
| W 113–97
| Paul Westphal (29)
| Madison Square Garden13,494
| 39–36
| W 7
|- align="center" bgcolor="#ffcccc"
| 76
| March 31
| @ Boston
| L 102–122
| Nate Hawthorne (22)
| Boston Garden8,200
| 39–37
| L 1
|-
!!Streak
|-
|- align="center" bgcolor="#ccffcc"
| 77
| April 2
| Portland
| W 106–103
| Alvan Adams (20)
| Arizona Veterans Memorial Coliseum10,424
| 40–37
| W 1
|- align="center" bgcolor="#ffcccc"
| 78
| April 3
| @ Portland
| L 97–112
| Paul Westphal (28)
| Memorial Coliseum9,010
| 40–38
| L 1
|- align="center" bgcolor="#ffcccc"
| 79
| April 4
| @ Seattle
| L 89–117
| Alvan Adams (21)
| Seattle Center Coliseum14,096
| 40–39
| L 2
|- align="center" bgcolor="#ffcccc"
| 80
| April 6
| @ Golden State
| L 106–111 (OT)
| Alvan Adams (30)
| Oakland–Alameda County Coliseum Arena11,809
| 40–40
| L 3
|- align="center" bgcolor="#ccffcc"
| 81
| April 8
| Los Angeles
| W 113–98
| Ricky Sobers (23)
| Arizona Veterans Memorial Coliseum13,036
| 41–40
| W 1
|- align="center" bgcolor="#ccffcc"
| 82
| April 10
| Seattle
| W 121–95
| Alvan Adams (19)
| Arizona Veterans Memorial Coliseum9,577
| 42–40
| W 2
|-

Playoffs

Game log

|- align="center" bgcolor="#ffcccc"
| 1
| April 13
| @ Seattle
| L 99–102
| Paul Westphal (24)
| Gar Heard (10)
| Paul Westphal (10)
| Seattle Center Coliseum12,408
| 0–1
|- align="center" bgcolor="#ccffcc"
| 2
| April 15
| @ Seattle
| W 116–111
| Alvan Adams (23)
| Curtis Perry (12)
| Alvan Adams (7)
| Seattle Center Coliseum14,096
| 1–1
|- align="center" bgcolor="#ccffcc"
| 3
| April 18
| Seattle
| W 103–91
| Heard, Westphal (16)
| Gar Heard (14)
| Westphal, Adams (6)
| Arizona Veterans Memorial Coliseum13,036
| 2–1
|- align="center" bgcolor="#ccffcc"
| 4
| April 20
| Seattle
| W 130–114
| Paul Westphal (39)
| Gar Heard (11)
| Ricky Sobers (8)
| Arizona Veterans Memorial Coliseum13,036
| 3–1
|- align="center" bgcolor="#ffcccc"
| 5
| April 25
| @ Seattle
| L 108–114
| Paul Westphal (27)
| Dennis Awtrey (12)
| three players tied (4)
| Seattle Center Coliseum14,096
| 3–2
|- align="center" bgcolor="#ccffcc"
| 6
| April 27
| Seattle
| W 123–112
| Keith Erickson (20)
| Heard, Adams (9)
| Alvan Adams (10)
| Arizona Veterans Memorial Coliseum13,192
| 4–2
|-

|- align="center" bgcolor="#ffcccc"
| 1
| May 2
| @ Golden State
| L 103–128
| Curtis Perry (22)
| Alvan Adams (14)
| Alvan Adams (6)
| Oakland–Alameda County Coliseum Arena12,475
| 0–1
|- align="center" bgcolor="#ccffcc"
| 2
| May 5
| @ Golden State
| W 108–101
| Paul Westphal (31)
| Gar Heard (12)
| Alvan Adams (9)
| Oakland–Alameda County Coliseum Arena13,067
| 1–1
|- align="center" bgcolor="#ffcccc"
| 3
| May 7
| Golden State
| L 91–99
| Paul Westphal (24)
| Alvan Adams (14)
| Ricky Sobers (6)
| Arizona Veterans Memorial Coliseum13,306
| 1–2
|- align="center" bgcolor="#ccffcc"
| 4
| May 9
| Golden State
| W 133–129 (2OT)
| Keith Erickson (28)
| Gar Heard (18)
| Paul Westphal (8)
| Arizona Veterans Memorial Coliseum12,884
| 2–2
|- align="center" bgcolor="#ffcccc"
| 5
| May 12
| @ Golden State
| L 95–111
| Curtis Perry (23)
| Curtis Perry (18)
| Westphal, Sobers (4)
| Oakland–Alameda County Coliseum Arena13,067
| 2–3
|- align="center" bgcolor="#ccffcc"
| 6
| May 14
| Golden State
| W 105–104
| Ricky Sobers (21)
| Gar Heard (15)
| three players tied (6)
| Arizona Veterans Memorial Coliseum13,396
| 3–3
|- align="center" bgcolor="#ccffcc"
| 7
| May 16
| @ Golden State
| W 94–86
| Gar Heard (21)
| Alvan Adams (20)
| Westphal, Perry (4)
| Oakland–Alameda County Coliseum Arena13,067
| 4–3
|-

|- align="center" bgcolor="#ffcccc"
| 1
| May 23
| @ Boston
| L 87–98
| Alvan Adams (26)
| Curtis Perry (10)
| Ricky Sobers (7)
| Boston Garden15,320
| 0–1
|- align="center" bgcolor="#ffcccc"
| 2
| May 27
| @ Boston
| L 90–105
| Paul Westphal (28)
| Alvan Adams (15)
| Westphal, Adams (5)
| Boston Garden15,320
| 0–2
|- align="center" bgcolor="#ccffcc"
| 3
| May 30
| Boston
| W 105–98
| Alvan Adams (33)
| Alvan Adams (14)
| Paul Westphal (6)
| Arizona Veterans Memorial Coliseum12,284
| 1–2
|- align="center" bgcolor="#ccffcc"
| 4
| June 2
| Boston
| W 109–107
| Paul Westphal (28)
| Gar Heard (15)
| Paul Westphal (9)
| Arizona Veterans Memorial Coliseum13,306
| 2–2
|- align="center" bgcolor="#ffcccc"
| 5
| June 4
| @ Boston
| L 126–128 (3OT)
| Westphal, Sobers (25)
| Curtis Perry (15)
| Perry, Sobers (6)
| Boston Garden15,320
| 2–3
|- align="center" bgcolor="#ffcccc"
| 6
| June 6
| Boston
| L 80–87
| Alvan Adams (20)
| Gar Heard (10)
| Alvan Adams (6)
| Arizona Veterans Memorial Coliseum13,306
| 2–4
|-

Awards and honors

All-Star
Alvan Adams was selected as a reserve for the Western Conference in the All-Star Game. It was his first and only All-Star selection.

Season
Alvan Adams received the Rookie of the Year Award.
Jerry Colangelo received the Executive of the Year Award.
Alvan Adams was named to the NBA All-Rookie First Team.
Paul Westphal finished 24th in MVP voting.

Player statistics

Season

* – Stats with the Suns.
† – Minimum 300 field goals made.
^ – Minimum 125 free throws made.
+ – Minimum 70 games played or 800 rebounds.

Playoffs

^ – Minimum 10 free throws made.

Transactions

Trades

Free agents

Additions

Subtractions

References

Phoenix Suns seasons
Phoenix
Western Conference (NBA) championship seasons